Waverly, also known as Waverley, is a historic house located near Middleburg, Fauquier County, Virginia.  The original section was built about 1790, and later enlarged about 1830, and enlarged and remodeled in the 1850s.  It is a single-pile, center-hall, two-story dwelling, a typical example of an I-house.  It has a long, two-story rear ell and has Gothic Revival style decorative detailing.  The front facade features a full-width two-story portico with six square piers supporting a flat roof with a plain wooden parapet.  The house was renovated after 1940 by architect David Adler.

It was listed on the National Register of Historic Places in 1979.

Peyton House, built during 1831–34 in Raymond, Mississippi, appears to have been modeled upon Waverly.

References

Houses on the National Register of Historic Places in Virginia
Carpenter Gothic houses in Virginia
Houses completed in 1790
Houses in Fauquier County, Virginia
National Register of Historic Places in Fauquier County, Virginia
David Adler buildings